79 athletes (60 men and 19 women) from Italy competed at the 1996 Summer Paralympics in Atlanta, United States.

Medalists

See also
Italy at the Paralympics
Italy at the 1996 Summer Olympics

References 

Nations at the 1996 Summer Paralympics
1996
Summer Paralympics